Orang Airport  is a small airport located in Orang County, approximately 40 kilometres south of Chongjin, North Hamgyong in North Korea. Built by the Imperial Japanese Army, designated as K-33 (Hoemun Airfield) by the USAF during the Korean War, Orang Airport is now controlled by the Korean People's Army. Hoemun Airfield was renamed when the original Chongin Airfield K-34 was abandoned after the Korean War.  The airport is normally used by the military, though a small number of commercial passenger flights also operate there.

The airport also serves Rason, which is about a three-hour drive away.

Facilities

There is one runway in the airport, originally 1,200m long, which was extended to 2,500m. There is no arrival terminal, baggage is given directly from the trolley. One bus can carry arriving passengers from the runway to the single, rather departures-related building, if the flight is full some passengers can walk. Departure terminal "building" has a waiting lounge (for about 20 people), 1 check-in desk, one security scanner and an old Czechoslovak scale. There are very basic toilets. There are plans to further extend the runway to 4,000m to allow it to serve as a second international gateway to North Korea.

Airlines and destinations

{
  "type": "FeatureCollection",
  "features": [
    {
      "type": "Feature",
      "properties": {
        "marker-color": "0050d0",
        "marker-symbol": "city",
        "marker-size": "large"
      },
      "geometry": {
        "type": "Point",
        "coordinates": [
          129.64304924011233,
          41.43288157977508
        ]
      }
    },
    {
      "type": "Feature",
      "properties": {"marker-symbol": "airport"},
      "geometry": {
        "type": "Point",
        "coordinates": [
          125.67702770233156,
          39.2017638496899
        ]
      }
    }
  ]
}

See also

Transportation in North Korea

Airports in North Korea
Buildings and structures in North Hamgyong Province
Korean War air bases